Project 23130 is a series of medium-size replenishment oilers developed by the Spetssudoproect JSC and built by Nevsky Shipyard for the Russian Navy. Initially, it was to be limited only by one vessel, Akademik Pashin, however in January 2020, a decision was made to build five more vessels of the class. in parallel with Project 23130, larger Project 23131 oilers are being constructed by Zaliv shipyard in Crimea. It was indicated that the Russian Navy planned to create an "Arctic Group" to operate some of these ships within the Northern Fleet.

Design
Project 23130 tankers are a medium-sized sea tankers with a strengthened steel double-hull of the Arc 4 class, for operations in the Arctic conditions. They can operate in temperatures from +45 ºС in summer to -30 ºС in winter. The service life of ships' hull and pipelines is estimated at 40 years. When fully loaded, they could displace about 14,000 tons while carrying about 7,350 tons of various liquids in its onboard storage tanks as well as some dry cargoes. The total deadweight of the ship is 9,000 tons at maximal draught.

Ships

See also
 List of active Russian Navy ships
 Future of the Russian Navy

References

External links
 Project 23130 at RussianShips

Auxiliary replenishment ship classes
Auxiliary ships of the Russian Navy
Oilers